Altaf Shakoor (born 15 August 1959) is a Pakistani politician who is the founder and current president of Pasban, a Pakistani social-political organization.

Early life 
Altaf Shakoor was born on August 15, 1959 in Karachi, Sindh. He is an engineer by education and trader by profession.

Political career 
In 1994, he founded the Pasban Party and he was elected as president of Pasban Pakistan in the same year. He then established various branches of Pasban in Sindh province, the most literate part in the south of Pakistan. It highlights the problems faced by common man of the society in media.

External links
Pasban's official site

References

Pakistani activists
Living people
Year of birth missing (living people)
Pakistani human rights activists
People from Karachi